This is a list of diplomatic missions of Benin. Owing to its small size, the Republic of Benin maintains a very modest diplomatic network abroad. Its paramount relationship is with France, the former colonial power.

Honorary consulates are excluded from this list.

Africa

Addis Ababa (Embassy)

Rabat (Embassy)

Abuja (Embassy)
Lagos (Consulate-General)

Americas

Havana (Embassy)

 Washington, D.C. (Embassy)

Asia

Beijing (Embassy)

Tokyo (Embassy)

Kuwait City (Embassy)

 Doha (Embassy)

Riyadh (Embassy)

Europe

Paris (Embassy)

Moscow (Embassy)

Multilateral organization 
 
New York City (Permanent mission)

Gallery

See also

 Foreign relations of Benin

References
 Les représentations diplomatiques du Bénin

 
Benin
Diplomatic missions